F52  or F-52 may refer to:
 F52 (classification), a para-athletics classification
 BMW 1 Series (F52), a car
 , a Leander-class frigate of the Royal Navy
 Samsung Galaxy F52 5G, a smartphone
 Wright F-52 Cyclone, an American radial aircraft engine